Éadbhard de Nógla ('Edward Nagle' in English form) (fl. 1748) was an Irish tailor and Jacobite poet.

Biography

De Nógla was a descendant of Jocelyn de Angulo and a son of the lawyer, Patrick Nagle (a close friend of executed Jacobite, James Cotter the Younger).

References

 Mil na hÉigse:Dunaire i gcomhair an árd-teastais, R. Ó Foghuludha, B.Á.C, 1945.
 Ireland and the Jacobite Cause, 1685-1766:A fatal attachment, pp. 282–83, 318, 319, 340, Éamonn Ó Ciardha, Four Courts Press, 2001, 2004. .

Irish poets
18th-century Irish-language poets
Irish Jacobites
People from County Cork